Marie Joseph Pierre François Kœnig or Koenig (10 October 1898 – 2 September 1970) was a French general during World War II during which he commanded a Free French Brigade at the Battle of Bir Hakeim in North Africa in 1942. He started a political career after the war and was posthumously elevated to the dignity of Marshal of France in 1984.

Early life 
Marie-Pierre Kœnig was born on 10 October 1898, in Caen, Calvados, France. His parents were from the Alsace region.

Military career

World War I 
Kœnig fought in the French Army during World War I and served with distinction. He obtained his baccalaureate and enlisted in 1917. He served in the 36th Infantry Regiment. He was designated as an aspirant in February 1918 and joined his unit at the front. Decorated with the Médaille militaire, he was promoted to sous-lieutenant on 3 September 1918.

Interwar career
After the war, he served with French forces in Morocco and Cameroon. He served in Silesia as assistant of captain  in the Alpes, in Germany, then in Morocco, at the general staff headquarters of the division of Marrakesh.

World War II 
Kœnig was a captain and assistant to lieutenant-colonel Raoul Magrin-Vernerey in the 13th Demi-Brigade of Foreign Legion of the French Foreign Legion.

When World War II broke out, Kœnig returned to France. In 1940, he was assigned as a captain with the French troops in Norway, for which he was later awarded the Krigskorset med Sverd or Norwegian War Cross with Sword, in 1942. After the fall of France he escaped to England from Brittany.

In London, Kœnig joined General Charles de Gaulle and was promoted to colonel. He became chief of staff in the first divisions of the Free French Forces. In 1941, he served in the campaigns in Syria and Lebanon. He was later promoted to general and took command of the First French Brigade in Egypt. His unit of 3700 men held ground against five Axis divisions (c. 37,000 men) for 16 days at the Battle of Bir Hakeim until they were ordered to evacuate on 11 June 1942. General de Gaulle said to Kœnig: "Hear and tell your troops: the whole of France is watching you, you are our pride."

Later, Kœnig served as the Free French delegate to the Allied headquarters under General Dwight D. Eisenhower. In 1944, he was given command of the Free French who participated in the Invasion of Normandy. Kœnig also served as a military advisor to de Gaulle. In June 1944, he was given command of the French Forces of the Interior (FFI) to unify various French Resistance groups under de Gaulle's control. Under his command, the FFI abandoned ranged battle in the Maquis, preferring sabotage waged in support of the invading army. Important in D-Day, the role of the FFI became decisive in the battle for Normandy and in the landing in Provence of the US Seventh Army and French Army B. On 21 August 1944, de Gaulle appointed Kœnig military governor of Paris to restore law and order. In 1945, he was sent to arrest Marshal Pétain, who had taken refuge in Germany, but who gave himself up at the frontier with Switzerland.

Cold War 
After the war, Kœnig was military governor of the French occupation zone in Germany from 1945 to 1949. In 1949, he became inspector general in North Africa and in 1950 vice-president of the Supreme War Council.

Political career 

In 1951, after his retirement from the army, Kœnig was elected as Gaullist representative to the French National Assembly and briefly served as Minister of Defense under Pierre Mendès-France (1954) and Edgar Faure (1955).

He gave his strong support to the new State of Israel as president of the Franco-Israeli Committee (Comité franco-israélien), at around the same time when he was France's Defense Minister, as shown from his informing his Israeli counterpart Shimon Peres that France was willing to sell Israel any weapons it wished to purchase, from small arms to tanks (such as the AMX-13 light tank). Kœnig had witnessed the heroism of a battalion of Palestinian Jewish mine layers during the Battle of Bir Hakeim and afterwards allowed them to fly their own Star-of-David flag, against British regulations.

Death 
Marie-Pierre Kœnig died on 2 September 1970, in Neuilly-sur-Seine, and was buried at Montmartre Cemetery in Paris.

Homage 
There are streets named after Kœnig in Jerusalem, Netanya and Haifa.

Military ranks

Honours and decorations

National honours

Ministerial honours

Decorations and medals

Foreign honours

See also 
Susan Travers
Works by Jean Fréour: Sculptor of Kœnig memorial

References

Notes

External links 
Newsreel of when he was awarded the Legion of Merit by Eisenhower (3:01)
Biography on the website of the Order of Liberation (French)

Generals of World War II

1898 births
1970 deaths
Military personnel from Caen
Politicians from Caen
Rally of the French People politicians
National Centre of Social Republicans politicians
Government ministers of France
Deputies of the 2nd National Assembly of the French Fourth Republic
Deputies of the 3rd National Assembly of the French Fourth Republic
Marshals of France
French military personnel of World War I
French Army generals of World War II
Military governors of Paris
French people of the Algerian War
Recipients of the Order of the White Lion
Companions of the Liberation
Companions of the Distinguished Service Order
Companions of the Order of the Bath
Grand Croix of the Légion d'honneur
Recipients of the Croix de Guerre 1914–1918 (France)
Recipients of the Croix de Guerre 1939–1945 (France)
Recipients of the Croix de guerre des théâtres d'opérations extérieures
Commanders of the Order of Agricultural Merit
Recipients of the Resistance Medal
Recipients of the Aeronautical Medal
Commanders of the Legion of Merit
Recipients of the Order of Suvorov, 1st class
Recipients of the Croix de guerre (Belgium)
Grand Crosses of the Order of the Crown (Belgium)
Knights Grand Cross of the Order of Orange-Nassau
Grand Crosses of the Order of the Dannebrog
Recipients of the War Cross (Norway)
Recipients of the Virtuti Militari
Recipients of the Czechoslovak War Cross
Grand Crosses of the Order of George I
Grand Crosses of the Order of Saint-Charles
Officers of the French Foreign Legion
Burials at Montmartre Cemetery